The Embassy of Paraguay in London is the diplomatic mission of Paraguay in the United Kingdom.

Gallery

References

External links
Official site

Paraguay
Diplomatic missions of Paraguay
Paraguay–United Kingdom relations
Buildings and structures in the Royal Borough of Kensington and Chelsea
Holland Park